Jasmeet Singh Raina (born November 4, 1989), professionally known as Jus Reign, is a Canadian comedian and music artist of Indian descent. He is most prominently known as a YouTube personality, and one of Much Digital Studios' original creators.

Early life
Jasmeet Singh Raina was raised in Guelph, Ontario, Canada into an immigrant Indian Kashmiri Sikh family. When he was 5 years old, his father started paying a maestro to teach Jasmeet and his younger brother, Anmol, in Indian classical music. Jasmeet played the Tabla. He started to dislike playing it and as he has stated in his "Draw My Life" on YouTube, he argued with his teacher to the point where he got a tabla thrown at his face. He studied at the University of Guelph, where he originally studied to become a doctor to appease his parents' wishes. Eventually, the sketches Raina was creating on the side went viral and his parents accepted that their son had found success and have since been supportive of his YouTube career.

Career
Singh’s upbringing and his Indian roots have provided material for his viral videos (his most popular being THE SWAG SONG). Most of his work contains pop culture parodies, while others provide commentary on race and his struggles with racism.

While attending the University of Guelph, Singh first met Rupan Bal and invited him to be in his YouTube video 'A-1 Shopping Cart Driving School'. Singh was impressed by Bal's natural comedic skills and decided to incorporate Bal further into his YouTube videos, creating the fictional character of Jus Reign's stereotypical Indian mother. The two worked together in a number of YouTube videos and later co-starred together in the Punjabi film 22g Tussi Ghaint Ho. This was Singh's only acting credit in the Punjabi film industry.

Singh is also one of Much Digital Studios' original creators, among a roster of various other online influencers.

In 2015, he was the red carpet correspondent for the Much Music Video Awards. Singh also starred in the web series Dhaliwal '15 where he played Bobby Dhaliwal, the first candidate of colour to run for prime minister in the 2015 Canadian federal election. The series was created and directed by Canadian filmmaker Amita Zamaan.

In June 2016 Raina was featured as a guest writer in 24 Hours Toronto's daily city snapshot "The Six in Toronto", highlighting hot spots to eat and hang out in Toronto. In summer 2016 Raina was included in The Bay St. Bull's "Power 50" list of most influential Canadians for his entrepreneurial skills and online notoriety. On June 19, 2016, he co-hosted the iHeartRadio Much Music Video Awards red carpet, speaking to stars like Shemar Moore and Tyler Posey. 
In 2016, Raina was featured in Playback Magazine's Top 5 to Watch. Also in 2016, he had co-hosted the Scotiabank Giller Prize.

Jus Reign made an appearance on Jimmy Kimmel Live!, in a creator edition of the show's Mean Tweets segment in June 2016.

In 2017, he and fellow comedian Wahlid Mohammad had started a podcast called Just 2  Boyz.

In December 2018, Raina took an indefinite hiatus from social media, including YouTube. Reasons for his departure are unknown.

In October 2019, Raina (along with other Canadian actors) starred in an interactive web-documentary by the National Film Board of Canada called Supreme Law. Raina plays the role of former Canadian Prime Minister, Pierre Elliott Trudeau.

In 2020, it was announced that Late Bloomer, a comedy series produced by fellow Indo-Canadian comedian Russell Peters, about Raina's rise to fame, was in development for CBC Television.

Personal life
Raina has developed a strong connection with his Sikh heritage, during his visits to Punjab, India with his family and friends (as he portrays in his videos).

Turban controversy
On February 22, 2016, Raina was forced to remove his Turban at San Francisco International Airport, an hour before boarding a flight to Toronto. Raina, who has a Sikh background, wears a turban for religious reasons. After being told to either remove his turban or book another flight, Raina complied, removing his turban in a private room.

After completing the security check, Raina asked if security officials could provide him with a mirror so he could re-tie his turban in private. But TSA agents refused, suggesting he walk across the terminal to a public restroom — his head still uncovered — and use a mirror there. Raina noted the experience was an embarrassing and sensitive ordeal, and that a simple fix, like adding a mirror to the private screening area or providing him with a handheld mirror, would have been more respectful.

The incident led to backlash on Twitter and garnered international headlines in Cosmopolitan India, Seventeen, New York Daily News, and BBC Asia. While a TSA spokesperson made a statement explaining the screening processes for religious garments, they did not apologize directly for the incident with Raina. After the incident, Raina took his frustration over the issue over social media, which sparked a media outrage over TSA racial profiling in general.

Filmography

Film

Television

Web

Awards and nominations

See also
 South Asian Canadians in the Greater Toronto Area

References

External links
 

1989 births
Living people
Kashmiri people
Canadian people of Indian descent
Canadian people of Kashmiri descent
Canadian Sikhs
People from Guelph
Comedians from Ontario
Canadian male comedians
Canadian musicians of Indian descent
Canadian YouTubers
Video bloggers
Male bloggers